Helmuth Lohner (24 April 1933 – 23 June 2015) was an Austrian actor, theatre director, and from 1997 to 2006 director of the Theater in der Josefstadt.

Early life
Born in Vienna, Lohner initially trained as a commercial artist, while also taking private acting lessons. He made his acting début in 1952 at the municipal theatre in Baden bei Wien. He also appeared as operetta buffo at the Stadttheater Klagenfurt. From 1953 to 1963 he appeared in various productions of the Theater in der Josefstadt, as well as making numerous film appearances.

Career
Further engagements in Berlin, Munich, Hamburg, Düsseldorf and Zurich followed. Between them he appeared at the Burgtheater, and at the Salzburg Festival several times, taking the roles of "Death", "The Devil" and "Jedermann" in Hugo von Hofmannsthal's play Jedermann (which by tradition is performed every year). He made his film debut in 1955 in Josef von Báky's Hotel Adlon. From 1963 he was active in television as actor and director.

Personal life
Lohner married and divorced the German actress Susanne Cramer twice. Their daughter Konstanze Lohner is a pedagogue in Germany. He then married the German actress Karin Baal, with whom he had a daughter, actress Therese Lohner. In 2011, he married Elisabeth Gürtler-Mauthner. The couple lived together for 19 years before their marriage.

Death
Helmuth Lohner died on 23 June 2015 at the age of 82.

Selected works

As opera director 
 1994: La belle Hélène by Jacques Offenbach
 1997: The Merry Widow by Franz Lehár
 1999: Eine Nacht in Venedig by Johann Strauss II
 2002: Die Csárdásfürstin by Emmerich Kálmán
 2005: The Magic Flute by Wolfgang Amadeus Mozart

As theatre actor
 1978:  Das weite Land by Arthur Schnitzler, directed by Otto Schenk
 1987:  Der einsame Weg by Arthur Schnitzler, directed by Thomas Langhoff
 1991–1993: Ein Jedermann (Salzburg festival)
 1999: Figaro lässt sich scheiden by Ödön von Horváth, directed by Luc Bondy

Partial filmography 

 Das Licht der Liebe (1954) – (uncredited)
 An der schönen blauen Donau (1955)
 Hotel Adlon (1955) – Erzherzog Karl
 Urlaub auf Ehrenwort (1956) Grenadier Richard Hellwig
 My Sixteen Sons (1956)
 King in Shadow (1957) – Count Holck
 Salzburg Stories (1957) – Franz
 Wie schön, daß es dich gibt (1957) – Rainer
 Widower with Five Daughters (1957) – Dr. Klaus Hellmann
 The Spessart Inn (1958) – Felix
 Stefanie (1958)
 The House of Three Girls (1958) – Moritz von Schwind
 Eva (1959) – Ein Student
  (1959) – Martin Graf Waldau / Count Waldau
 Marili (1959) – Peter Markwart
 Mrs. Warren's Profession (1960) – Frank Gardner
 Pension Schöller (1960) – Peter Klapproth
 Immer will ich dir gehören (1960) – Klaus Stettner
 My Husband, the Economic Miracle (1961) – Tommy Schiller – ein Journalist
 Mann im Schatten (1961) – Franz Villinger
 You Must Be Blonde on Capri (1961) – Hannes Niklas
  (1961) – Oliver Fleming
 Im sechsten Stock (1961) – Jojo, Arbeiter
 So toll wie anno dazumal (1962) – Susannes Traummann #3 (uncredited)
  (1962) – Nikolaus Tschinderle
 The Seventh Victim (1964) – Gerald Mant
  (1968, TV Mini-Series) – Manfred Krupka
 Hannibal Brooks (1969) – Willi
 Liliom (1971, TV Movie, directed by Otto Schenk) – Liliom
 Der Paukenspieler (1971) – Friedrich Hofstetter
  (1973, directed by Otto Schenk) – The Count
 Derrick (1974, TV Series) – Alfred Balke
 Aus nichtigem Anlass (1976, TV film) – Ullrich Wältzing
  (1981, TV film) – Fedor Protasov
 Shalom Pharao (1982) – Joseph (voice)
 Der elegante Hund (1987–1988, TV Series) – Alois Stange
 Zucker (1989, TV Movie) – Leo Kaminski 
 Mozart und da Ponte (1989) – Narrator
  (1990, TV film) – Gottfried von Yosch
 Harms (2013) – Onkel

Decorations and awards
 1980 Kainz Medal
 1988 Nestroy Ring
 1991 Gold Honorary Medal of Vienna
 1992 Kammerschauspieler
 2001 Nestroy nomination for Best Actor
 2003 Honorary Member of the Theater in der Josefstadt
 2003 Austrian Cross of Honour for Science and Art, 1st class
 2006 Gold Medal for services to the City of Vienna

References

External links

1933 births
2015 deaths
Male actors from Vienna
Austrian theatre directors
Austrian male musical theatre actors
Austrian male film actors
Austrian male television actors
20th-century Austrian male actors
21st-century Austrian male actors
Recipients of the Austrian Cross of Honour for Science and Art, 1st class